The Cheshire Cup is an annual rugby union knock-out club competition organized by the Cheshire Rugby Football Union. It was first introduced in the 1877–78 season as the Cheshire Challenge County Cup and the inaugural competition was won by Birkenhead Park, who along with eight other local sides including New Brighton and Sale, made up the club members of the Cheshire RFU at that time. Four years later the cup was discontinued due to arguments over whether cup ties were beneficial to the county game. The Cheshire RFU reintroduced the cup during the 1969–70 season, with Sale the first winners of the competition in over 80 years.

The Cheshire Cup is currently the premier county cup competition for club sides in tier 4 (National League 2 North) and tier 5 (National League 3 North or National League 3 Midlands) of the English rugby union system that are based in either Cheshire, Merseyside or the Isle of Man. Originally it was the only men's county cup competition but plate, shield and bowl competitions have been introduced over the years for lower ranked clubs. The current format is as a knock-out cup with a quarter-final, semi-final and final which is held at a neutral venue during the latter stages of the season (March–May).  At present Cheshire Cup finals are held on the same date and at the same venue as Cheshire Plate finals.

Cheshire Cup winners

Number of wins
Sale (17)
Macclesfield (8)
New Brighton (7)
Caldy (6)
Winnington Park (5)
Birkenhead Park (4)
Sale Jets (2)
Sale FC (2)
Chester (1)
Lymm (1)
Wilmslow (1)

Notes

See also
 Cheshire RFU
 Cheshire Vase
 Cheshire Bowl
 Cheshire Plate
 English rugby union system
 Rugby union in England

References

External links
 Cheshire RFU

Recurring sporting events established in 1877
Recurring sporting events established in 1969
Rugby union cup competitions in England
Rugby union in Cheshire